Auhunga is a genus of South Pacific tangled nest spiders containing the single species, Auhunga pectinata. It was  first described by Raymond Robert Forster & C. L. Wilton in 1973, and has only been found in New Zealand.

References

External links

Amaurobiidae
Monotypic Araneomorphae genera
Spiders of New Zealand
Taxa named by Raymond Robert Forster